Charles Rollin Keyes (1864–1942) was a U.S. geologist and in 1918 was a U.S. Senate candidate in Iowa. Born in Des Moines, Iowa, he graduated from the State University of Iowa in 1887. He worked for the United States Geological Survey. He earned a Ph.D. from Johns Hopkins University in 1892. He served as Assistant State Geologist of Iowa, Director of the Bureau of Geology and Mines of Missouri and was president of the New Mexico Institute of Mining and Technology at Socorro. Keyes was also an avid ornithologist, publishing the first detailed listing of birds in Iowa in 1889. In 1918 he was the Democratic candidate for the U.S. Senate from Iowa, losing to William S. Kenyon.

Selected works by Keyes
1884  Paleontology of Missouri (Missouri Geological Survey Vol. IV, Pts. 1–2)
1889  Preliminary Annotated Catalogue of the Birds of Iowa. Proc. of the Davenport Academy of Natural Sciences, Vol. V, pp. 113–161.
1894  Coal Deposits of Iowa Iowa Geological Survey
1895  Geology of Des Moines County. Iowa Geological Survey, Des Moines.
1895  Origin and Relation of Central Maryland Granites, U.S. Geological Survey.
1910  A Family of Great Horned Owls. The Independent:852–859.
1910  Geology of Iowa County. Iowa Geological Survey, Des Moines.
1913  Historical Sketch of Mining in Iowa. Iowa Geological Survey, Des Moines.

References

1864 births
American geologists
Geology of Iowa
Johns Hopkins University alumni
Iowa State University alumni
New Mexico Institute of Mining and Technology faculty
United States Geological Survey personnel
Iowa Democrats
1942 deaths
American ornithologists